Katalon Platform is an automation testing software tool developed by Katalon, Inc. The software is built on top of the open-source automation frameworks Selenium, Appium with a specialized IDE interface for web, API, mobile and desktop application testing. Its initial release for internal use was in January 2015. Its first public release was in September 2016. In 2018, the software acquired 9% of market penetration for UI test automation, according to The State of Testing 2018 Report by SmartBear.

Katalon is recognized as a March 2019 and March 2020 Gartner Peer Insights Customers’ Choice for Software Test Automation.

Platform 
Katalon Platform provides a dual interchangeable interface for creating test cases: a manual view for the less technical users and a script view gearing toward experienced testers to author automation tests with syntax highlight and intelligent code completion.

Katalon Platform follows the Page Object Model pattern. GUI elements on web, mobile, and desktop apps can be captured using the recording utility and stored into the Object Repository, which is accessible and reusable across different test cases.

Test cases can be structured using test suites with environment variables. Test execution can be parameterized and parallelized using profiles.

Remote execution in Katalon Platform can be triggered by CI systems via Docker container or command line interface (CLI).

From version 7.4.0, users are able to execute test cases from Selenium projects, along with the previous migration from TestNG and JUnit to Katalon Platform.

In version 7.8, users can save team effort while debugging with smart troubleshooting approaches offered via highlight features: Time Capsule, Browser-based Video Recorder, Self-healing and Test Failure Snapshots.

Provided in the latest version 8.4.0 is the native integration with Azure DevOps (ADO) which enables users to easily map test cases in Azure DevOps to automated test cases in Katalon Platform. Additionally, this new integration will allow users to automatically send test execution logs and reports from Katalon Platform to test run in ADO, which will enable them to get a clearer picture of the testing process. Other highlight features offered in this version are reusable desired capabilities across projects, 60% faster load time to speed up team working process, a newly-made product tour to enhance user experience and so on.

Technologies 
The test automation framework provided within Katalon Platform was developed with the keyword-driven approach as the primary test authoring method with data-driven functionality for test execution.

The user interface is a complete integrated development environment (IDE) implemented on Eclipse rich client platform (RCP).

The keyword libraries are a composition of common actions for web, API, and mobile testings. External libraries written in Java can be imported into a project to be used as native functions.

The main programming language used in Katalon Platform are Groovy and Java. Katalon Platform supports cross-environment test executions based on Selenium and Appium.

Supported technologies

 Modern web technologies: HTML, HTML5, JavaScript, Ajax, Angular
 Windows desktop apps platforms: Universal Windows Platform (UWP), Windows Forms (WinForms), Windows Presentation Foundation (WPF), and Classic Windows (Win32)
 Cross-browser testing: Firefox, Chrome, Microsoft Edge, Internet Explorer (9,10,11), Safari, headless browsers
 Mobile apps: Android and iOS (Native apps and mobile web apps)
 Web services: RESTful and SOAP

System requirements

Operating systems: Windows 7, Windows 8, Windows 10, macOS 10.11+, Linux (Ubuntu-based)

License  
Katalon Platform started out as Freeware. In October 2019, Katalon introduced a new product set with proprietary licenses in its seventh release. The new products and licenses include, including Katalon Platform (Free), Katalon Platform Enterprise, and Katalon Runtime Engine, so that teams and projects of various complexities can have a flexible allocation on budget, licensing, and scalability.
Several features that were previously free were moved to the Katalon Platform Enterprise license.

Core products

Katalon TestOps 

Katalon TestOps is a web-based application that provides visualized test data and execution results through charts, graphs, and reports. Its key features include test management, test planning, and test execution. Katalon TestOps can be integrated with Jira and other CI/CD tools.

Katalon TestOps was originally released as Katalon Analytics in November 2017. In October 2019, Katalon officially changed the name to Katalon TestOps. It is currently available in the May 2021 version and is expected to provide DevOps team with the optimal test orchestration.

Katalon Recorder 

Katalon Recorder is a browser add-on for recording user's actions in web applications and generating test scripts. Katalon Recorder supports both Chrome and Firefox. Katalon Recorder functions in the same way as Katalon Platform's recording utility, but it can also execute test steps and export test scripts in many languages such as C#, Java, and Python.

Katalon Recorder 5.4 was released in May 2021.

Katalium 

Katalium is a framework that provides a blueprint for test automation projects based on Selenium and TestNG. The framework is built to help users who still need to work with TestNG and Selenium to quickly set up test cases.

Katalium Server is a component of the Katalium framework. It is a set of enhancements to improve the user experience with Selenium Grid. Katalium Server can be run as a Standalone (single) server in development mode.

Both Katalium Framework and Katalium Server are made open-source.

Katalon Store 

Katalon Store serves as a platform for testers and developers to install add-on products (or ‘plugins’) and add more features and optimize test automation strategies in Katalon Platform. Users can install, manage, rate, and write reviews for plugins.

In Katalon Store, plugins are made available in 3 main categories: Integration, Custom Keywords, and Utilities. Katalon Store also allows users to build and submit their own plugins.

Integrations 

Katalon Platform can be integrated with other software products, including:

Software development life cycle (SDLC) management: Jira, TestRail, qTest, and TestLink
 CI/CD integration: Jenkins, Bamboo, TeamCity, CircleCI, Azure DevOps, and Travis CI
 Team collaboration: Git, Slack, and Microsoft Teams
 Execution platform support: Selenium, BrowserStack, SauceLabs, LambdaTest, and Kobiton
 Visual testing: Applitools

See also 

 Selenium (software)
 Appium
 Test automation
 GUI software testing
 Comparison of GUI testing tools
 List of GUI testing tools
 List of web testing tools

References

Graphical user interface testing
Software testing tools